Jacques Sébastien François Léonce Marie Paul Fagot (1842–1908) was a French malacologist who often published under the name Paul Fagot.

Life and career

Fagot was part of a "New School" of naturalists, which included Jules-René Bourguignat, Aristide-Horace Letourneux,  Jules François Mabille, and  Étienne Alexandre Arnould Locard. Species of land snails that were named and described by Fagot include Aegopinella epipedostoma, Pyrenaearia navasi, and Pyrenaearia cotiellae.

References

External links
Paul Fagot profile via American Malacological Society

1842 births
1908 deaths
French malacologists